This was the first edition of the tournament.

Rameez Junaid  and Tim Pütz won the title, defeating Colin Ebelthite and Lee Hsin-han  6–0, 6–2 in the final.

Seeds

Draw

Draw

References
 Main Draw

Doubles
Svijany Open doubles